Peugeot has sold a number of vehicle models since 1896.

Current production vehicles

Produced under license by IKCO 

 Peugeot 206/206 SD
 Peugeot 207/207 SD
 Peugeot 405 SLX
 Peugeot Pars

Former production vehicles

Historical vehicles (1889-1928)

Lion-Peugeot Models 

In establishing Automobiles Peugeot in 1889, Armand Peugeot split his company from the rest of the family company, overseen by his second cousin Eugène. When Eugène relinquished most of his control over the non-automobile portion of the company to his sons, they entered an agreement with Armand in which he would manufacture cars for their brand badged as "Lion-Peugeots". The two began a merger in 1910, though the separate badge was retained through 1916.

 Type VA (1906-8) - the first car from either Peugeot brand tell sell over 1000 units.
 Types VC:
 Type VC1 (1906–10) - known simply as the Type VC until the introduction of additional models into the range.
 Type VC2 (1909–10) - extended wheelbase variant of the VC1.
 Type V2C2 (1910) - variant of the VC2 with a two-cyclinder engine.
 Type VC3 (1911) - successor to the VC1 and VC2, though very mechanically similar.
 Type V2C3 (1911) - variant of the VC3 with a two-cylinder engine.
 Type V4C3 (1912-3) - variant of the VC3 with a four-cylinder engine.
 Types VY:
 Type VY (1908-9) - sporting variant of the VC1.
 Type VY2 (1908-9) - extended wheelbase variant of the VY.
 Type V2Y2 (1910) - successor to the VY2, now with a two-cylinder engine.
 Type V2Y3 (1911) - successor to the V2Y2, though very mechanically similar.
 Types VD:
Type VD (1913-4) - known as the V4D for its second year of production.
Type VD2 (1915) - successor to the VD. The last Lion-Peugeot model due to the outbreak of the first world war.

Concept vehicles

See also 
 Peugeot
 Lion-Peugeot
 Armand Peugeot
 Stellantis
 Groupe PSA
 Automotive Industry in France
Category:Peugeot vehicles
Category:Peugeot concept vehicles

References